Pukkarambai is a village in the Pattukkottai taluk of Thanjavur district, Tamil Nadu, India.

Demographics 

As per the 2001 census, Pukkarambai had a total population of 2599 with 1252 males and 1347 females. The sex ratio was 1076. The literacy rate was 61.86.

References 

 

Villages in Thanjavur district